École polytechnique universitaire de Lille (Polytech Lille) a French engineering College created in 1974.

The school trains engineers in nine majors :

 Mechanical Engineering
 Software Engineering and Statistics
 Geotechnics and Civil Engineering
 Geomatics and Urban Engineering
 Biological and Food Engineering
 Electrical and Computer Engineering
 Measurement Systems and Applied Business
 Materials Science
 Production System - Operations Engineering

Located in Villeneuve-d'Ascq, Polytech Lille is a public higher education institution. The school is a member of the University of Lille.

Notable alumni 
 Patrick Cordier, a mineralogist who uses experimental and numerical approaches to study the plasticity of geological materials.

References

External links
 Polytech Lille

Engineering universities and colleges in France
Villeneuve-d'Ascq
Polytech Lille
Lille
Educational institutions established in 1974
1974 establishments in France